In mathematics, more specifically in functional analysis, a Banach space (pronounced ) is a complete normed vector space. Thus, a Banach space is a vector space with a metric that allows the computation of vector length and distance between vectors and is complete in the sense that a Cauchy sequence of vectors always converges to a well-defined limit that is within the space.

Banach spaces are named after the Polish mathematician Stefan Banach, who introduced this concept and studied it systematically in 1920–1922 along with Hans Hahn and Eduard Helly. 
Maurice René Fréchet was the first to use the term "Banach space" and Banach in turn then coined the term "Fréchet space."
Banach spaces originally grew out of the study of function spaces by Hilbert, Fréchet, and Riesz earlier in the century. Banach spaces play a central role in functional analysis. In other areas of analysis, the spaces under study are often Banach spaces.

Definition

A Banach space is a complete normed space  
A normed space is a pair 
 consisting of a vector space  over a scalar field  (where  is commonly  or ) together with a distinguished 
norm  Like all norms, this norm induces a translation invariant 
distance function, called the canonical or (norm) induced metric, defined by

for all vectors  This makes  into a metric space  

where because  this sequence's convergence to  can equivalently be expressed as:

By definition, the normed space  is a  if the norm induced metric  is a complete metric, or said differently, if  is a complete metric space. 
The norm  of a normed space  is called a  if  is a Banach space.

L-semi-inner product

For any normed space  there exists an L-semi-inner product  on  such that  for all ; in general, there may be infinitely many L-semi-inner products that satisfy this condition. L-semi-inner products are a generalization of inner products, which are what fundamentally distinguish Hilbert spaces from all other Banach spaces. This shows that all normed spaces (and hence all Banach spaces) can be considered as being generalizations of (pre-)Hilbert spaces.

Characterization in terms of series

The vector space structure allows one to relate the behavior of Cauchy sequences to that of converging series of vectors. 
A normed space  is a Banach space if and only if each absolutely convergent series in  converges in

Topology

Every normed space is automatically assumed to carry this Hausdorff topology, unless indicated otherwise. 
With this topology, every Banach space is a Baire space, although there exist normed spaces that are Baire but not Banach. The norm  is always a continuous function with respect to the topology that it induces.

The open and closed balls of radius  centered at a point  are, respectively, the sets 
 
Any such ball is a convex and bounded subset of  but a compact ball/neighborhood exists if and only if  is a finite-dimensional vector space. 
In particular, no infinite–dimensional normed space can be locally compact or have the Heine–Borel property. 
 
Using  shows that this norm-induced topology is translation invariant, which means that for any  and  the subset  is open (respectively, closed) in  if and only if this is true of its translation  
Consequently, the norm induced topology is completely determined by any neighbourhood basis at the origin. Some common neighborhood bases at the origin include:

So for example, every open subset  of  can be written as a union 

indexed by some subset  where every  is of the form  for some integer  (the closed ball can also be used instead of the open ball, although the indexing set  and radii  may need to be changed). 
Since every Banach space is a Fréchet space, this is also true of all infinite–dimensional separable Banach spaces, including the separable Hilbert 2 sequence space  with its usual norm  where (in sharp contrast to finite−dimensional spaces)  is also homeomorphic to its unit  

Compact and convex subsets

There is a compact subset  of  whose convex hull  is  closed and thus also  compact (see this footnote for an example). 
However, like in all Banach spaces, the  convex hull  of this (and every other) compact subset will be compact. But if a normed space is not complete then it is in general  guaranteed that  will be compact whenever  is; an example can even be found in a (non-complete) pre-Hilbert vector subspace of 

As a topological vector spaces

This norm-induced topology also makes  into what is known as a topological vector space (TVS), which by definition is a vector space endowed with a topology making the operations of addition and scalar multiplication continuous. It is emphasized that the TVS  is  a vector space together with a certain type of topology; that is to say, when considered as a TVS, it is  associated with  particular norm or metric (both of which are "forgotten"). This Hausdorff TVS  is even locally convex because the set of all open balls centered at the origin forms a neighbourhood basis at the origin consisting of convex balanced open sets. This TVS is also , which by definition refers to any TVS whose topology is induced by some (possibly unknown) norm.  Normable TVSs are characterized by being Hausdorff and having a bounded convex neighborhood of the origin. 

Comparison of complete metrizable vector topologies

The open mapping theorem implies that if  are topologies on  that make both  and  into complete metrizable TVS (for example, Banach or Fréchet spaces) and if one topology is finer or coarser than the other then they must be equal (that is, if ).

Completeness

Complete norms and equivalent norms

See this footnote for an example of a continuous norm on a Banach space that is  equivalent to that Banach space's given norm. 
All norms on a finite-dimensional vector space are equivalent and every finite-dimensional normed space is a Banach space.

Complete norms vs complete metrics

In contrast, a theorem of Klee, which also applies to all metrizable topological vector spaces, implies that if there exists  complete metric  on  that induces the norm topology  on  then  is a Banach space.

A Fréchet space is a locally convex topological vector space whose topology is induced by some translation-invariant complete metric. 
Every Banach space is a Fréchet space but not conversely; indeed, there even exist Fréchet spaces on which no norm is a continuous function (such as the space of real sequences  with the product topology). 
However, the topology of every Fréchet space is induced by some countable family of real-valued (necessarily continuous) maps called seminorms, which are generalizations of norms. 
but to not be a Banach/normable space because its topology can not be defined by any  norm. 
An example of such a space is the Fréchet space  whose definition can be found in the article on spaces of test functions and distributions.

Complete norms vs complete topological vector spaces

There is another notion of completeness besides metric completeness and that is the notion of a complete topological vector space (TVS) or TVS-completeness, which uses the theory of uniform spaces. 
Specifically, the notion of TVS-completeness uses a unique translation-invariant uniformity, called the canonical uniformity, that depends  on vector subtraction and the topology  that the vector space is endowed with, and so in particular, this notion of TVS completeness is independent of whatever norm induced the topology  (and even applies to TVSs that are  even metrizable). 
Every Banach space is a complete TVS. Moreover, a normed space is a Banach space (that is, its norm-induced metric is complete) if and only if it is complete as a topological vector space. 

A Hausdorff locally convex topological vector space  is normable if and only if its strong dual space  is normable, in which case  is a Banach space ( denotes the strong dual space of  whose topology is a generalization of the dual norm-induced topology on the continuous dual space ; see this footnote for more details). 
If  is a metrizable locally convex TVS, then  is normable if and only if  is a Fréchet–Urysohn space. 
This shows that in the category of locally convex TVSs, Banach spaces are exactly those complete spaces that are both metrizable and have metrizable strong dual spaces.

Completions

This Hausdorff completion is unique up to isometric isomorphism.

General theory

Linear operators, isomorphisms

A linear mapping from a normed space  to another normed space is continuous if and only if it is bounded on the closed unit ball of  Thus, the vector space  can be given the operator norm

For  a Banach space, the space  is a Banach space with respect to this norm.  In categorical contexts, it is sometimes convenient to restrict the function space between two Banach spaces to only the short maps; in that case the space  reappears as a natural bifunctor.

If  is a Banach space, the space  forms a unital Banach algebra; the multiplication operation is given by the composition of linear maps.

Continuous and bounded linear functions and seminorms
Every continuous linear operator is a bounded linear operator and if dealing only with normed spaces then the converse is also true. That is, a linear operator between two normed spaces is bounded if and only if it is a continuous function. This allows for continuity-related results (like those below) to be applied to Banach spaces. Although boundedness is the same as continuity for linear maps between normed spaces, the term "bounded" is more commonly used when dealing primarily with Banach spaces.

And very importantly for applying the Hahn–Banach theorem, a linear functional  is continuous if and only if this is true of its real part  and moreover,  and the real part  completely determines  which is why the Hahn–Banach theorem is often stated only for real linear functionals.

Basic notions

The Cartesian product  of two normed spaces is not canonically equipped with a norm. However, several equivalent norms are commonly used, such as

which correspond (respectively) to the coproduct and product in the category of Banach spaces and short maps (discussed above).  For finite (co)products, these norms give rise to isomorphic normed spaces, and the product  (or the direct sum ) is complete if and only if the two factors are complete.

If  is a closed linear subspace of a normed space  there is a natural norm on the quotient space 

The quotient  is a Banach space when  is complete. The quotient map from  onto  sending  to its class  is linear, onto and has norm  except when  in which case the quotient is the null space.

where the first map  is the quotient map, and the second map  sends every class  in the quotient to the image  in  This is well defined because all elements in the same class have the same image. The mapping  is a linear bijection from  onto the range  whose inverse need not be bounded.

Classical spaces

Basic examples of Banach spaces include: the Lp spaces  and their special cases, the sequence spaces  that consist of scalar sequences indexed by natural numbers ; among them, the space  of absolutely summable sequences and the space  of square summable sequences; the space  of sequences tending to zero and the space  of bounded sequences; the space  of continuous scalar functions on a compact Hausdorff space  equipped with the max norm,

According to the Banach–Mazur theorem, every Banach space is isometrically isomorphic to a subspace of some  For every separable Banach space  there is a closed subspace  of  such that 

Any Hilbert space serves as an example of a Banach space.

where

is the inner product, linear in its first argument that satisfies the following:

For example, the space  is a Hilbert space.

The Hardy spaces, the Sobolev spaces are examples of Banach spaces that are related to  spaces and have additional structure. They are important in different branches of analysis, Harmonic analysis and Partial differential equations among others.

Banach algebras

An equivalent norm on  can be found so that  for all

Examples

 The Banach space  with the pointwise product, is a Banach algebra.
 The disk algebra  consists of functions holomorphic in the open unit disk  and continuous on its closure:  Equipped with the max norm on  the disk algebra  is a closed subalgebra of 
 The Wiener algebra  is the algebra of functions on the unit circle  with absolutely convergent Fourier series.
 A C*-algebra is a complex Banach algebra  with an antilinear involution  such that  The space  of bounded linear operators on a Hilbert space  is a fundamental example of C*-algebra. The Gelfand–Naimark theorem states that every C*-algebra is isometrically isomorphic to a C*-subalgebra of some  The space  of complex continuous functions on a compact Hausdorff space  is an example of commutative C*-algebra, where the involution associates to every function  its complex conjugate

Dual space

If  is a normed space and  the underlying field (either the real or the complex numbers), the continuous dual space is the space of continuous linear maps from  into  or continuous linear functionals. 
Since  is a Banach space (using the absolute value as norm), the dual  is a Banach space, for every normed space 

The main tool for proving the existence of continuous linear functionals is the Hahn–Banach theorem.

In particular, every continuous linear functional on a subspace of a normed space can be continuously extended to the whole space, without increasing the norm of the functional. 
An important special case is the following: for every vector  in a normed space  there exists a continuous linear functional  on  such that

When  is not equal to the  vector, the functional  must have norm one, and is called a norming functional for 

The Hahn–Banach separation theorem states that two disjoint non-empty convex sets in a real Banach space, one of them open, can be separated by a closed affine hyperplane. 
The open convex set lies strictly on one side of the hyperplane, the second convex set lies on the other side but may touch the hyperplane.

The orthogonal  is a closed linear subspace of the dual.

The dual of a separable Banach space need not be separable, but:

When  is separable, the above criterion for totality can be used for proving the existence of a countable total subset in

Weak topologies

The norm topology is therefore finer than the weak topology. 
It follows from the Hahn–Banach separation theorem that the weak topology is Hausdorff, and that a norm-closed convex subset of a Banach space is also weakly closed. 

If  is infinite-dimensional, there exist linear maps which are not continuous.

On a dual space  there is a topology weaker than the weak topology of  called weak* topology. 
Its importance comes from the Banach–Alaoglu theorem.

The Banach–Alaoglu theorem can be proved using Tychonoff's theorem about infinite products of compact Hausdorff spaces. 
When  is separable, the unit ball  of the dual is a metrizable compact in the weak* topology.

Examples of dual spaces

The dual of Lebesgue space  is isometrically isomorphic to  when  and 

For every vector  in a Hilbert space  the mapping

The mapping  is an antilinear isometric bijection from  onto its dual  
When the scalars are real, this map is an isometric isomorphism.

The subset  of  consisting of non-negative measures of mass 1 (probability measures) is a convex w*-closed subset of the unit ball of  
The set of Dirac measures on  equipped with the w*-topology, is homeomorphic to 

The theorem is no longer true when the distance is 

In the commutative Banach algebra  the maximal ideals are precisely kernels of Dirac measures on 

More generally, by the Gelfand–Mazur theorem, the maximal ideals of a unital commutative Banach algebra can be identified with its characters—not merely as sets but as topological spaces: the former with the hull-kernel topology and the latter with the w*-topology. 
In this identification, the maximal ideal space can be viewed as a w*-compact subset of the unit ball in the dual 

Not every unital commutative Banach algebra is of the form  for some compact Hausdorff space  However, this statement holds if one places  in the smaller category of commutative C*-algebras. 
Gelfand's representation theorem for commutative C*-algebras states that every commutative unital C*-algebra  is isometrically isomorphic to a  space. 

Bidual

For every normed space  there is a natural map,

As a consequence of the existence of a norming functional  for every  this map  is isometric, thus injective.

If  is surjective, then the normed space  is called reflexive (see below). 
Being the dual of a normed space, the bidual  is complete, therefore, every reflexive normed space is a Banach space.

Using the isometric embedding  it is customary to consider a normed space  as a subset of its bidual. 
The Goldstine theorem states that the unit ball of a normed space is weakly*-dense in the unit ball of the bidual. 
In other words, for every  in the bidual, there exists a net  in  so that

The net may be replaced by a weakly*-convergent sequence when the dual  is separable. 

Banach's theorems

Here are the main general results about Banach spaces that go back to the time of Banach's book and are related to the Baire category theorem. 
According to this theorem, a complete metric space (such as a Banach space, a Fréchet space or an F-space) cannot be equal to a union of countably many closed subsets with empty interiors. 
Therefore, a Banach space cannot be the union of countably many closed subspaces, unless it is already equal to one of them; a Banach space with a countable Hamel basis is finite-dimensional.

The Banach–Steinhaus theorem is not limited to Banach spaces. 

This result is a direct consequence of the preceding Banach isomorphism theorem and of the canonical factorization of bounded linear maps.

This is another consequence of Banach's isomorphism theorem, applied to the continuous bijection from  onto  sending  to the sum

Reflexivity

The normed space  is called reflexive when the natural map

is surjective. Reflexive normed spaces are Banach spaces.

This is a consequence of the Hahn–Banach theorem. 
Further, by the open mapping theorem, if there is a bounded linear operator from the Banach space  onto the Banach space  then  is reflexive.

Indeed, if the dual  of a Banach space  is separable, then  is separable. 

Hilbert spaces are reflexive. The  spaces are reflexive when  More generally, uniformly convex spaces are reflexive, by the Milman–Pettis theorem. 
The spaces  are not reflexive. 
In these examples of non-reflexive spaces  the bidual  is "much larger" than  
Namely, under the natural isometric embedding of  into  given by the Hahn–Banach theorem, the quotient  is infinite-dimensional, and even nonseparable. 
However, Robert C. James has constructed an example of a non-reflexive space, usually called "the James space" and denoted by  such that the quotient  is one-dimensional. 
Furthermore, this space  is isometrically isomorphic to its bidual.

In a Hilbert space  the weak compactness of the unit ball is very often used in the following way: every bounded sequence in  has weakly convergent subsequences.

Weak compactness of the unit ball provides a tool for finding solutions in reflexive spaces to certain optimization problems. 
For example, every convex continuous function on the unit ball  of a reflexive space attains its minimum at some point in 

As a special case of the preceding result, when  is a reflexive space over  every continuous linear functional  in  attains its maximum  on the unit ball of  
The following theorem of Robert C. James provides a converse statement.

The theorem can be extended to give a characterization of weakly compact convex sets.

On every non-reflexive Banach space  there exist continuous linear functionals that are not norm-attaining. 
However, the Bishop–Phelps theorem states that norm-attaining functionals are norm dense in the dual  of

Weak convergences of sequences

Weakly Cauchy sequences, weakly convergent and weakly* convergent sequences are norm bounded, as a consequence of the Banach–Steinhaus theorem.

The Banach space  is weakly sequentially complete if every weakly Cauchy sequence is weakly convergent in  
It follows from the preceding discussion that reflexive spaces are weakly sequentially complete.

An orthonormal sequence in a Hilbert space is a simple example of a weakly convergent sequence, with limit equal to the  vector. 
For every weakly null sequence in a Banach space, there exists a sequence of convex combinations of vectors from the given sequence that is norm-converging to 

This means that  satisfies Schur's property.

Results involving the  basis

Weakly Cauchy sequences and the  basis are the opposite cases of the dichotomy established in the following deep result of H. P. Rosenthal.

A complement to this result is due to Odell and Rosenthal (1975).

When the Banach space  is separable, the unit ball of the dual  equipped with the weak*-topology, is a metrizable compact space  and every element  in the bidual  defines a bounded function on :

This function is continuous for the compact topology of  if and only if  is actually in  considered as subset of  
Assume in addition for the rest of the paragraph that  does not contain  
The unit ball of the bidual is a pointwise compact subset of the first Baire class on

Sequences, weak and weak* compactness

When  is separable, the unit ball of the dual is weak*-compact by the Banach–Alaoglu theorem and metrizable for the weak* topology, hence every bounded sequence in the dual has weakly* convergent subsequences. 
This applies to separable reflexive spaces, but more is true in this case, as stated below.

The weak topology of a Banach space  is metrizable if and only if  is finite-dimensional.
This applies in particular to separable reflexive Banach spaces. 
Although the weak topology of the unit ball is not metrizable in general, one can characterize weak compactness using sequences.

A Banach space  is reflexive if and only if each bounded sequence in  has a weakly convergent subsequence.

Indeed, every sequence in  has weakly convergent subsequences by Eberlein–Šmulian, that are norm convergent by the Schur property of

Schauder bases

Banach spaces with a Schauder basis are necessarily separable, because the countable set of finite linear combinations with rational coefficients (say) is dense.

It follows from the Banach–Steinhaus theorem that the linear mappings  are uniformly bounded by some constant  
They are called biorthogonal functionals. When the basis vectors have norm  the coordinate functionals  have norm  in the dual of 

Most classical separable spaces have explicit bases. 
The Haar system  is a basis for   
The trigonometric system is a basis in  when  
The Schauder system is a basis in the space  
The question of whether the disk algebra  has a basis remained open for more than forty years, until Bočkarev showed in 1974 that  admits a basis constructed from the Franklin system.

The first example by Enflo of a space failing the approximation property was at the same time the first example of a separable Banach space without a Schauder basis.

Robert C. James characterized reflexivity in Banach spaces with a basis: the space  with a Schauder basis is reflexive if and only if the basis is both shrinking and boundedly complete. 
In this case, the biorthogonal functionals form a basis of the dual of

Tensor product

Let  and  be two -vector spaces.

If  is any bilinear mapping into a -vector space  then there exists a unique linear mapping  such that 

There are various norms that can be placed on the tensor product of the underlying vector spaces, amongst others the projective cross norm and injective cross norm introduced by A. Grothendieck in 1955.

In general, the tensor product of complete spaces is not complete again.
Grothendieck proved in particular that

The two isomorphisms above are the respective extensions of the map sending the tensor  to the vector-valued function

Tensor products and the approximation property

Let  be a Banach space.
When  has the approximation property, this closure coincides with the space of compact operators on 

For every Banach space  there is a natural norm  linear map

obtained by extending the identity map of the algebraic tensor product. Grothendieck related the approximation problem to the question of whether this map is one-to-one when  is the dual of 
Precisely, for every Banach space  the map

is one-to-one if and only if  has the approximation property.

This was disproved by Gilles Pisier in 1983. 
Furthermore, just as Enflo's example, this space  is a "hand-made" space that fails to have the approximation property. On the other hand, Szankowski proved that the classical space  does not have the approximation property.

Some classification results

Characterizations of Hilbert space among Banach spaces

A necessary and sufficient condition for the norm of a Banach space  to be associated to an inner product is the parallelogram identity:

It follows, for example, that the Lebesgue space  is a Hilbert space only when  
If this identity is satisfied, the associated inner product is given by the polarization identity. In the case of real scalars, this gives:

For complex scalars, defining the inner product so as to be -linear in  antilinear in  the polarization identity gives:

To see that the parallelogram law is sufficient, one observes in the real case that  is symmetric, and in the complex case, that it satisfies the Hermitian symmetry property and  The parallelogram law implies that  is additive in  
It follows that it is linear over the rationals, thus linear by continuity.

Several characterizations of spaces isomorphic (rather than isometric) to Hilbert spaces are available. 
The parallelogram law can be extended to more than two vectors, and weakened by the introduction of a two-sided inequality with a constant : Kwapień proved that if

for every integer  and all families of vectors then the Banach space  is isomorphic to a Hilbert space. 
Here,  denotes the average over the  possible choices of signs 
In the same article, Kwapień proved that the validity of a Banach-valued Parseval's theorem for the Fourier transform characterizes Banach spaces isomorphic to Hilbert spaces.

Lindenstrauss and Tzafriri proved that a Banach space in which every closed linear subspace is complemented (that is, is the range of a bounded linear projection) is isomorphic to a Hilbert space. The proof rests upon Dvoretzky's theorem about Euclidean sections of high-dimensional centrally symmetric convex bodies. In other words, Dvoretzky's theorem states that for every integer  any finite-dimensional normed space, with dimension sufficiently large compared to  contains subspaces nearly isometric to the -dimensional Euclidean space.

The next result gives the solution of the so-called . An infinite-dimensional Banach space  is said to be homogeneous if it is isomorphic to all its infinite-dimensional closed subspaces.

An infinite-dimensional Banach space is hereditarily indecomposable when no subspace of it can be isomorphic to the direct sum of two infinite-dimensional Banach spaces. 
The Gowers dichotomy theorem asserts that every infinite-dimensional Banach space  contains, either a subspace  with unconditional basis, or a hereditarily indecomposable subspace  and in particular,  is not isomorphic to its closed hyperplanes. 
If  is homogeneous, it must therefore have an unconditional basis. It follows then from the partial solution obtained by Komorowski and Tomczak–Jaegermann, for spaces with an unconditional basis, that  is isomorphic to

Metric classification

This result implies that the metric in Banach spaces, and more generally in normed spaces, completely captures their linear structure.

Topological classification

Finite dimensional Banach spaces are homeomorphic as topological spaces, if and only if they have the same dimension as real vector spaces.

Anderson–Kadec theorem (1965–66) proves that any two infinite-dimensional separable Banach spaces are homeomorphic as topological spaces. Kadec's theorem was extended by Torunczyk, who proved that any two Banach spaces are homeomorphic if and only if  they have the same density character, the minimum cardinality of a dense subset.

Spaces of continuous functions

Although uncountable compact metric spaces can have different homeomorphy types, one has the following result due to Milutin:

The situation is different for countably infinite compact Hausdorff spaces. 
Every countably infinite compact  is homeomorphic to some closed interval of ordinal numbers

equipped with the order topology, where  is a countably infinite ordinal. 
For example, the Banach spaces

are mutually non-isomorphic.

Examples

Derivatives

Several concepts of a derivative may be defined on a Banach space. See the articles on the Fréchet derivative and the Gateaux derivative for details. 
The Fréchet derivative allows for an extension of the concept of a total derivative to Banach spaces. The Gateaux derivative allows for an extension of a directional derivative to locally convex topological vector spaces. 
Fréchet differentiability is a stronger condition than Gateaux differentiability. 
The quasi-derivative is another generalization of directional derivative that implies a stronger condition than Gateaux differentiability, but a weaker condition than Fréchet differentiability.

Generalizations

In Fréchet spaces one still has a complete metric, while LF-spaces are complete uniform vector spaces arising as limits of Fréchet spaces.

See also

Notes

References

Bibliography

  
  
  
 .*  
 .
 .
  
 .
 
  
  
  
 .
 .
  
  
  
 .
  
  
  
  
 .

External links

 
 

 
Functional analysis
 
Science and technology in Poland
Topological vector spaces